Daizō, Daizo, Daizou or Daizoh (written: 大蔵, 大造, 大三 or 太三) is a masculine Japanese given name. Notable people with the name include:

, Japanese modern pentathlete
, Japanese sumo wrestler
, Japanese footballer
, Japanese politician
, Japanese footballer
Daizo Sumida  (住田 代蔵, 1887 – 1961), Japanese businessman
, Japanese sumo wrestler

Japanese masculine given names